Springhill Township is the name of some places in the U.S. state of Pennsylvania:

Springhill Township, Fayette County, Pennsylvania
Springhill Township, Greene County, Pennsylvania

Pennsylvania township disambiguation pages